Shandong Province Youth Football Team   (Simplified Chinese: 山东省青年足球队) is a Chinese football club based in Weifang. The club plays in the China League Two.

History
This club founded in 2011, based on Shandong Luneng Taishan football school, Weifang. In the 2011 China League Two, this team placed 3rd in the North and played quarter-final in the play-off round, lost to Chongqing F.C.

Results and Managers
{| width=950 class="wikitable" style="text-align: center; box-shadow: 4px 4px 4px #CCC; "
|-
! Season
! Division
! Teams
! Position
! Play
! Win
! Draw
! Lose
! GF
! GA
! GD
! Manager
|-
|2011||League Two||19||Quarter-final||16||10||1||5||32||16||+16||align=left| Hu Yijun
|-
|2012||League Two||26||10th, North Group||24||6||4||14||32||43||−11||
|}

References

External links
Shandong Youth Football Tournament

Football clubs in China
Association football clubs established in 2011
2011 establishments in China